The African Youth Championship 2001 was held in Ethiopia. It also served as qualification for the 2001 FIFA World Youth Championship.

Qualification

Preliminary round
Eritrea and Guinea Bissau withdrew. As a result, Kenya and Gambia advanced to the next round.

|}

First round
Congo-Brazzaville and Sierra Leone withdrew. As a result, Cameroon and Ghana advanced to the next round.

|}

Second round

|}

Teams
The following teams qualified for tournament:

 
 
 
  (host)

Group stage

Group 1

1 The match was abandoned in the 89th minute and the score at 0-0 after fans invaded the pitch believing that the teams had arranged a draw so both could progress. The match was ordered to be replayed two days later, with the results to be used to determine who would qualify for the semifinals but not to count in the standings. 
2 The match was originally scheduled for the 24th, but was postponed after the South African team had travel difficulties.

Semifinals play-off

Group 2

Semifinals

Third place match

Final

Qualification to World Youth Championship
The four best performing teams qualified for the 2001 FIFA World Youth Championship.

External links
Results by RSSSF

Africa U-20 Cup of Nations
Youth
2001
2001 in youth association football
Youth